Johnstone Kipkoech, (born 20 December 1968) is a Kenyan track and field athlete who won the gold medal in the 3000 metres steeplechase at the 1994 Commonwealth Games in Victoria, British Columbia, Canada in a games record time of 8:14.72 that stood until the 2014 Commonwealth Games.

References

Living people
1968 births
Kenyan male steeplechase runners
Commonwealth Games gold medallists for Kenya
Athletes (track and field) at the 1994 Commonwealth Games
Commonwealth Games medallists in athletics
African Games bronze medalists for Kenya
African Games medalists in athletics (track and field)
Athletes (track and field) at the 1991 All-Africa Games
Medallists at the 1994 Commonwealth Games